John Cole or Culle, of Wilton, Wiltshire, was an English coroner and Member of Parliament.

He was a Member (MP) of the Parliament of England for Wilton in 1372, 1381, October 1382, October 1383, April 1384, 1393 and 1394.

References

14th-century births
Year of death missing
English MPs 1372
People from Wilton, Wiltshire
English MPs 1381
English MPs October 1382
English MPs October 1383
English MPs April 1384
English MPs 1393
English MPs 1394